The Bear That Wasn't is a 1967 American animated short film directed by Chuck Jones and based on the children's book The Bear That Wasn't by Frank Tashlin. It was produced and released by Metro-Goldwyn-Mayer under its MGM Animation/Visual Arts division.

Plot
TBA

Production
The film was directed by Frank Tashlin's former Warner Bros. Cartoons colleague, Chuck Jones. It was the final animated short subject made by MGM and its subsidiary MGM Animation/Visual Arts, and also the second-to-last animated project for MGM (The Phantom Tollbooth would be the last).

While mostly the same as the book, the short features slight differences from the book, such as the elderly president of the factory being depicted as a dwarf whose face is never seen, as well as a bear cub also repeating exactly the same claim of the bear being a "silly man" after the zoo bears make a similar claim when the bear is brought to the zoo.

Despite being credited as a producer, Tashlin had no involvement in the short though Jones credited him only in the hopes of Tashlin receiving an Oscar for Best Short should the short win the Oscar, which it didn't (in those days, Oscars for Best Short were given to the producers, not the director). Overall, Tashlin was dissatisfied with this adaptation of his book, feeling that it didn't present its original message very well.

Availability 
The Bear That Wasn't is available on Looney Tunes Golden Collection: Volume 3, Disc 3 on the "From the Vaults" section and on the Looney Tunes Platinum Collection: Volume 1 Blu-ray box-set on Disc 3 as a bonus feature. It is also available on the Boomerang subscription streaming service under Volume 6 of MGM Cartoons titled Bear That Wasn't.

References

External links 
 
 
 

Animated films based on children's books
1967 films
1967 animated films
1960s American animated films
Short films directed by Chuck Jones
Films directed by Maurice Noble
Metro-Goldwyn-Mayer animated short films
Films scored by Dean Elliott
Animated films about bears
MGM Animation/Visual Arts short films
Films set in factories
Films set in zoos
1960s English-language films